Mestwinowo  is a settlement in the administrative district of Gmina Liniewo, within Kościerzyna County, Pomeranian Voivodeship, in northern Poland. It is located within the historic region of Pomerania.

The settlement has a population of 10.

During the German occupation of Poland (World War II), in October 1939, the SS and Selbstschutz murdered 46 Polish farmers from Jaroszewy in the village, after they were previously deceitfully gathered for a formal meeting in their home village.

References

Mestwinowo
Nazi war crimes in Poland